Reva B. Siegel (born 1956) is the Nicholas deB. Katzenbach Professor of Law at Yale Law School.  Siegel's writing draws on legal history to explore questions of law and inequality, and to analyze how courts interact with representative government and popular movements in interpreting the Constitution. She is currently writing on the role of social movement conflict in guiding constitutional change, addressing this question in recent articles on reproductive rights, originalism and the Second Amendment, the "de facto ERA," and the enforcement of Brown.  Her publications include Processes of Constitutional Decisionmaking (with Brest, Levinson, Balkin & Amar, 2014); The Constitution in 2020 (edited with Jack Balkin, 2009); and Directions in Sexual Harassment Law (edited with Catharine A. MacKinnon, 2004). Professor Siegel received her B.A., M.Phil, and J.D. from Yale University, clerked for Judge Spottswood Robinson on the D.C. Circuit, and began teaching at the University of California at Berkeley. She is a member of the American Academy of Arts and Sciences, and is active in the American Society for Legal History, the Association of American Law Schools, the American Constitution Society, in the national organization and as faculty advisor of Yale's chapter.
She was elected to the American Philosophical Society in 2018.

Scholarship 
One of her most notable works is "She the People: The Nineteenth Amendment, Sex Equality, Federalism, and the Family," 115 Harv. L. Rev. 947 (2002), which argues that the history leading up to the enactment of the Nineteenth Amendment to the United States Constitution, guaranteeing woman suffrage, should serve as the foundation for a more robust jurisprudence of sex equality.

Siegel's most recent work focuses on popular constitutionalism and Section Five of the Fourteenth Amendment to the United States Constitution, how social movements shape constitutional law, the rise of the New Right, and the popularization of antiabortion arguments that focus on protecting women.

Career 
Siegel graduated from Yale Law School in 1986, where she was an editor of The Yale Law Journal.  She joined the Yale faculty in 1994 after teaching at the Boalt Hall School of Law. She serves on the boards of the American Society for Legal History, the Center for WorkLife Law, and the Harvard Law & Policy Review. She is an active member of the American Constitution Society and faculty advisor to the ACS chapter at Yale Law School.

Selected works

Articles 
 Conscience Wars in Transnational Perspective: Religious Liberty, Third-Party Harm, and Pluralism in THE CONSCIENCE WARS: RETHINKING THE BALANCE BETWEEN RELIGION, IDENTITY, AND EQUALITY (Susanna Mancini & Michel Rosenfeld eds., Cambridge Univ. Press 2017) (with Doug NeJaime)
 Casey and the Clinic Closings: When "Protecting Health" Obstructs Choice, 125 YALE L.J. 1428 (2016) (with Linda Greenhouse)
 Democratic Constitutionalism, National Constitution Center White Paper (2015) (with Robert Post)
 Conscience and the Culture Wars, American Prospect, Summer 2015 (with Doug NeJaime)
 Conscience Wars: Complicity-Based Conscience Claims in Religion and Politics, 124 YALE L.J. 2516 (2015) (with Doug NeJaime)
 Compelling Interests and Contraception, 47 CONN. L. REV. 1026 (2015) (with Neil Siegel)
 Contraception as a Sex Equality Right, 124 YALE L.J.F. 349 (2015) (with Neil Siegel)
 How Conflict Entrenched the Right to Privacy, 124 YALE L.J.F. 316 (2015)
 Meador Lecture: Race-Conscious, But Race-Neutral? The Constitutionality of Disparate Impact in the Roberts Court, 66 ALA. L. REV. (2015)
 Harris Lecture: Abortion and the "Woman Question": Forty Years of Debate, 89 IND. L.J. 1365 (2014)
 Dignity and the Duty to Protect Unborn Life in UNDERSTANDING HUMAN DIGNITY (Christopher McCrudden ed. 2014)
 The Supreme Court, 2012 Term—Foreword: Equality Divided, 127 HARV. L. REV. 1 (2013)
 Equality Arguments for Abortion Rights, 60 UCLA L. REV. DISC. 160 (2013) (with Neil Siegel)
 Backlash to the Future? From Roe to Perry, 60 U.C.L.A. L. REV. DISC. (2013) (with Linda Greenhouse)
 Equality's Frontiers: How Congress's Section 5 Power Can Secure Transformative Equality, 122 YALE L.J. ONLINE 267 (2013)
 Equality and Choice: Sex Equality Perspectives on Reproductive Rights in the Work of Ruth Bader Ginsburg, 25 COLUM. J. GENDER & L. 63 (2013)
 The Constitutionalization of Abortion, in Michel Rosenfeld and Andras Sajo, eds., THE OXFORD HANDBOOK OF COMPARATIVE CONSTITUTIONAL LAW 1057 (Oxford: Oxford University Press 2012), reprinted in ABORTION LAW IN TRANSNATIONAL PERSPECTIVE: CASES AND CONTROVERSIES (Rebecca J. Cook, Joanna Erdman & Bernard H. Dickens 2014)
 Dignity and Sexuality: Claims on Dignity in Transnational Debates Over Abortion and Same-Sex Marriage, 10 INTL. J. CON. L. 335 (2012)
 Before (and After) Roe v. Wade: New Questions About Backlash, 120 Yale L.J. 2028 (2011) (with Linda Greenhouse)
 From Colorblindness to Antibalkanization: An Emerging Ground of Decision in Race Equality Cases, 120 YALE L.J. 1278 (2011)
 Roe Roots: The Women's Rights Claims that Engendered Roe, 90 B. U. L. Rev. 1875 (2010)
 Struck By Stereotype: Ruth Bader Ginsburg on Pregnancy Discrimination as Sex Discrimination, 59 DUKE L.J. (2010) (with Neil Siegel)
 Pregnancy and Sex-Role Stereotyping, From Struck to Carhart, 70 OHIO ST. L.J. (2009) (with Neil Siegel)
 Dignity and Reproductive Rights. SELA (The Seminario en Latinoamérica de Teoría Constitucional y Política – the Seminar in Latin America on Constitutional and Political Theory), June 2009 (Asunción, Paraguay)
 Heller and Originalism's Dead Hand - In Theory and Practice, 56 U.C.L.A. L. REV. 1399-1424 (2009)
 Introduction: The Constitutional Law and Politics of Reproductive Rights, 118 YALE L.J. 1312-17 (2009)
 Dead or Alive: Originalism as Popular Constitutionalism in Heller, 122 HARV. L. REV. 191 (2008)
 Dignity and the Politics of Protection: Abortion Restrictions Under Casey/Carhart , 117 YALE L.J. 1694-1800 (2008)
 2007 Brainerd Currie Lecture. The Right's Reasons: Constitutional Conflict and the Spread of Woman-Protective Antiabortion Argument, 57 DUKE L.J. 1641 (2008)
 Roe Rage: Democratic Constitutionalism and Backlash, 42 HARV.C.R.-C.L. L. Rev. 373 (2007) (co-authored with Robert Post)
 Sex Equality Arguments for Reproductive Rights: Their Critical Basis and Evolving Constitutional Expression, 56 EMORY L. J. 815 (2007)
 2006 Baum Lecture. The New Politics of Abortion: An Equality Analysis of Woman-Protective Abortion Restrictions, 2007 U. ILL. LAW REV 991 (2007)
 Originalism As a Political Practice: The Right's Living Constitution, 75 FORDHAM L. REV. 546-74 (2006) (co-authored with Robert Post)
 2005-06 Brennan Center Symposium Lecture, Constitutional Culture, Social Movement Conflict and Constitutional Change: The Case of the de facto ERA, 94 CAL. L. REV. 1323-1419 (2006)
 Mommy Dearest?: Woman-Protective Antiabortion Argument, AMERICAN PROSPECT (October 2006) (with Sarah Blustain)
 Democratic Constitutionalism: A Reply to Professor Barron, 1 HARV. L. & POL'Y REV. (Online) (Sept. 18, 2006) (co-authored with Robert Post)
 "You've Come A Long Way, Baby": Rehnquist's New Approach to Pregnancy Discrimination in Hibbs, 58 STAN. L. REV. 1871-98 (2006)
 Principles, Practices, and Social Movements, 154 U. PENN. L. REV. 927-50 (2006) (co-authored with Jack M. Balkin)
 Questioning Justice: Law and Politics in Judicial Confirmation Hearings, YALE LAW JOURNAL (THE POCKET PART), Jan. 2006, (co-authored with Robert Post)
 Roe as Sex Equality Opinion in WHAT ROE SHOULD HAVE SAID (J.M. Balkin ed. NYU Press 2005)
 The Jurisgenerative Role of Social Movements in U.S.Constitutional Law (for publication with the papers of the Seminario en Latino América de Teoria Constitucional y Politica (SELA), June 10–12, 2004, Oaxaca, México)
 Popular Constitutionalism, Departmentalism, and Judicial Supremacy, 92 CALIF. L. REV. 1027-43 (2004) (co-authored with Robert Post)
 Gender and the United States Constitution: Equal Protection, Privacy, and Federalism, in CONSTITUTING WOMEN: COMPARATIVE PERSPECTIVES (eds. Ruth Rubio-Marin & Beverley Baines, Cambridge Press 2004)
 Equality Talk: Antisubordination and Anticlassification Values in Constitutional Struggles Over Brown, 117 HARV. L.  REV. 1470-1547 (2004)
 The American Civil Rights Tradition—Anticlassification or Antisubordination?, in ISSUES IN LEGAL SCHOLARSHIP, THE ORIGINS AND FATE OF ANTISUBORDINATION THEORY: A SYMPOSIUM ON OWEN FISS'S "GROUPS AND THE EQUAL PROTECTION CLAUSE," reprinted in 58 U. MIAMI L. REV. 9 (2004)
 Legislative Constitutionalism and Section Five Power: Policentric Interpretation of the Family and Medical Leave Act, 112 YALE L.J.1943-2059 (2003) (co-authored with Robert Post)
 Protecting the Constitution from the People: Juricentric Restrictions on Section Five Power, 78 IND. L.J. 1-45 (2003)  (co-authored with Robert Post)
 She the People: The Nineteenth Amendment, Sex Equality, Federalism, and the Family, 115 HARV. L. REV. 947-1046 (2002)
 Text in Contest: Gender and the Constitution from a Social Movement Perspective, 150 U. PENN. L. REV. 297-351 (2001)
 Equal Protection By Law: Federal Antidiscrimination Legislation After Morrison and Kimel, 110 YALE L.J. 441-526 ( 2000) (co-authored with Robert Post)
 Discrimination in the Eyes of the Law: How "Color Blindness" Discourse Disrupts and Rationalizes Social Stratification, 88 CALIF. L. REV. 77-118 (2000), reprinted in Prejudicial Appearances (Duke Press 2001)
 Collective Memory and the Nineteenth Amendment: Reasoning About "the Woman Question" in the Discourse of Sex Discrimination in HISTORY, MEMORY, AND THE LAW (Austin Sarat & Thomas R. Kearnes eds. 1999)
 The Racial Rhetorics of Colorblind Constitutionalism: The Case of Hopwood v. Texas in RACE AND REPRESENTATION: AFFIRMATIVE ACTION (Robert Post & Michael Rogin eds.1998)
 Valuing Housework: Nineteenth-Century Anxieties about the Commodification of Domestic Labor, in Special Issue: Changing Forms of Payment, 41 AMERICAN BEHAVIORAL SCIENTIST 1437-51 (1998)
 Civil Rights Reform in Historical Perspective: Regulating Marital Violence in REDEFINING EQUALITY (Neil Devins & David Douglas eds.1998)
 Why Equal Protection No Longer Protects: The Evolving Forms of Status-Enforcing State Action, 49 STAN. L. REV.1111-1148 (1997)
 "The Rule of Love": Wife Beating as Prerogative and Privacy, 105 YALE L.J. 2117-2206 (1996)
 In the Eyes of the Law: Reflections on the Authority of Legal Discourse in LAW'S STORIES: NARRATIVE AND RHETORIC IN THE LAW (Peter Brooks & Paul Gewirtz eds., 1996)
 Modernizing Wife Beating in YALE LAW REPORT (Fall 1996)
 Abortion in A COMPANION TO AMERICAN THOUGHT (R. Fox & J. Kloppenberg eds., 1995)
 Abortion As a Sex Equality Right:  Its Basis in Feminist Theory in MOTHERS IN LAW: FEMINIST THEORY AND THE LEGAL REGULATION OF MOTHERHOOD (Martha Fineman & Isabel Karpin eds., 1995)
 The Modernization of Marital Status Law:  Adjudicating Wives' Rights to Earnings, 1860–1930, 82 GEO. L.J. 2127-2211 (1995)
 Home As Work:  The First Woman's Rights Claims Concerning Wives' Household Labor, 1850–1880, 103 YALE L.J. 1073-1217 (1994)
 Reasoning From the Body:  An Historical Perspective on Abortion Regulation and Questions of Equal Protection, 44 STAN. L. REV. 261-381 (1992)
 Book Review, 3 Berkeley Women's L.J. 171 (1988) (reviewing S. LEHRER, ORIGINS OF PROTECTIVE LABOR LEGISLATION FOR WOMEN, 1905 - 1915 (1987))
 Employment Equality Under the Pregnancy Discrimination Amendment of 1978, 94 YALE L.J. 929 (1985)

Books 
 Processes of Constitutional Decisionmaking (6th ed., 2014) (with Paul Brest, Sanford Levinson, Jack Balkin, and Akhil Amar)
 Before Roe v. Wade: Voices that Shaped the Abortion Debate Before the Supreme Court's Ruling (Kaplan Publishing, 2010) (with Linda Greenhouse).
 The Constitution in 2020 (forthcoming) (edited with Jack Balkin), including an essay by Professors Siegel and Balkin on Remembering How to Do Equality and an essay co-authored with Robert Post on Democratic Constitutionalism
 Directions in Sexual Harassment Law, co-edited with Catharine A. MacKinnon (Yale University Press, 2004). Collection of 40 essays, including authored introductory essay, A Short History of Sexual Harassment

References

External links 
 Reva Siegel faculty profile

American women lawyers
American legal scholars
Feminist studies scholars
1956 births
Living people
Yale Law School alumni
Yale Law School faculty
Members of the American Philosophical Society
American women legal scholars
Harvard Law School people
American women academics
21st-century American women